The Daniel and Catherine Ketchum Cobblestone House is located in Marquette, Wisconsin.

History
Daniel Ketchum was a prominent sea captain and his wife, Catherine, was a member of the Van Rensselaer family. During the 1920s and 1930s, it was used as the lodge for a ducking hunting club. It was added to the State and the National Register of Historic Places in 2001.

References

External links

Clubhouses on the National Register of Historic Places in Wisconsin
Cobblestone architecture
Greek Revival architecture in Wisconsin
Houses completed in 1851
Houses on the National Register of Historic Places in Wisconsin
National Register of Historic Places in Green Lake County, Wisconsin
Van Rensselaer family